Rhythm A Ning is an album by jazz composer, arranger, conductor and keyboardist Gil Evans, recorded in 1987 and performed by Evans with Laurent Cugny's Big Band Lumiere.

Reception
The AllMusic review by Scott Yanow awarded the album three stars, stating "This is a very interesting recording. Aging arranger/pianist Gil Evans agreed after much persuasion to come to Paris and play his music at a few concerts with Laurent Cugny's Orchestra. After only one rehearsal, the first event took place, and it gratified Evans to realize that the young French musicians were not only excellent players but big Gil Evans fans... they did an excellent job of bringing Gil Evans's music to life".

Track listing
All compositions by Gil Evans except as indicated
 "Rhythm-a-Ning" (Thelonious Monk) - 3:32
 "London" - 15:18
 "Stone Free" (Jimi Hendrix) - 10:41
 "Charles Mingus's Sound of Love" (Laurent Cugny) - 9:59
 "La Nevada" - 14:49 
Recorded at Studio Acousti in Paris on November 2 (track 4), November 3 (tracks 2 & 5) & November 26 (tracks 1 & 3), 1987

Personnel
Gil Evans - piano, electric piano, arranger, conductor
Laurent Cugny - keyboards, arranger, conductor  
Christian Martinez, Stéphane Belmondo, François Chassagnite - trumpet  
Denis Barbier - flute  
Bobby Rangell - alto saxophone, soprano saxophone
Pierre-Olivier Govin - alto saxophone  
Andy Sheppard, Charles Schneider - tenor saxophone
Bernard François - French horn  
Gilles Salommez - trombone  
Philippe Legris - tuba 
Manuel Rocheman - piano 
Benoît de Mesmay - keyboards  
Lionel Benhamou - guitar  
Dominique Di Piazza - bass guitar  
Stéphane Huchard - drums  
Xavier Desandre, Marilyn Mazur - percussion

References

1988 albums
Gil Evans albums
Albums arranged by Gil Evans
EmArcy Records albums